Gotcha! The Sport! is a video game for the Nintendo Entertainment System that was released in 1987. It uses the NES Zapper light gun and is a capture the flag-style game played with paintball guns loaded with simulated paintballs. The game was loosely based on the 1985 Universal Studios film Gotcha!, starring Anthony Edwards.

The player's mission is to get through the level, capture the enemy flag by shooting it, and return it to their base. This is while simultaneously trying not to get shot by the other team, run out of ammo, or run out of time. A light gun is necessary for this game, but one needs to also use the controller. The directional pad will move the screen left and right. Ammo boxes can be found sitting on the ground or carried by enemies in the background. It seems that only misses cost the player ammo, so if one's aim is precise, they will receive a significant bonus for leftover ammunition.

There are three levels in the game: Woods, Warehouse District and Snow Fields. The Woods and Snow Fields levels feature enemies in military garb, while the Warehouse District features enemies modeled after early 1980s punks. These rounds repeat in this order infinitely; each time around, the reaction time needed for the enemies to aim and fire is reduced.

Paintball guns
In addition to the video game, Entertech (a division of LJN) produced and sold paintball guns—and related gear—for kids using the same name and logo as the video game.
 The Enforcer, double pistol set
 The Commando
 protective glasses
 targets
 suits

References

External links

1987 video games
Atlus games
First-person shooters
Light gun games
LJN games
Multiplayer and single-player video games
Nintendo Entertainment System games
Nintendo Entertainment System-only games
North America-exclusive video games
Paintball video games
Video games based on films
Video games developed in Japan
Video games scored by Hirohiko Takayama
Video games set in forests